This is a list of French public schools in the area of eastern Ontario, Canada.

Alexandria
Terre des Jeunes

Casselman
L'Académie de La Seigneurie

Cornwall
Horizon-Jeunesse
Rose des Vents

Embrun
Rivière Castor

Hawkesbury
Nouvel Horizon

Kingston
Madeleine-de-Roybon

Ottawa
Des Sentiers
Gabrielle-Roy
Charlotte-Lemieux
Jeanne-Sauvé
Francojeunesse
Kanata
Le Prélude
Le Trillium
L'Odyssée
Marie-Curie
Michaëlle Jean
Séraphin-Marion
Maurice-LaPointe

Pembroke
L'Équinoxe

Rockland
Carrefour Jeunesse

Trenton
Cité-Jeunesse

Eastern Ontario Public French
French-language schools in Ontario